The Nyulnyul, also spelt Nyul Nyul,  Njolnjol,  Nyolnyol and other variants, are an Aboriginal Australian people of the Kimberley region of Western Australia.

Country
They were located on the western side of the Dampier Peninsula. Historically, the pressure of the Nimanburu led to them ceding ground on the King Sound, and by Tindale's time they were present from Cape Borda to Sandy Point, and at Carlyle Head and Goodenough Bay across the peninsula.

Running clockwise, their northern neighbours were the Bardi people, the Nimanburu lay on their southeastern flank, while the Djaberadjabera were directly south on the adjacent coast.

Language 
 
The Nyulnyul people spoke the Nyulnyul language.

Social organisation 
The Nyulnyul had a 4 section marriage and descent system.

Alternative spelling
 Njolnjol
 Nyolnyol
 Nyul Nyul

Notes

Citations

Sources

Aboriginal peoples of Western Australia